Orthostatic hypertension is a medical condition consisting of a sudden and abrupt increase  in blood pressure (BP) when a person stands up. Orthostatic hypertension is diagnosed by a rise in systolic BP of 20 mmHg or more when standing. Orthostatic diastolic hypertension is a condition in which the diastolic BP raises to 98 mmHg or over in response to standing, but this definition currently lacks clear medical consensus, so is subject to change. Orthostatic hypertension involving the systolic BP is known as systolic orthostatic hypertension.

If affecting an individual's ability to remain upright, orthostatic hypertension is viewed as a form of orthostatic intolerance. The body's inability to regulate BP can be a type of dysautonomia.

Baroreflex and autonomic pathways normally ensure that blood pressure is maintained despite various stimuli, including postural change.  The precise mechanism of orthostatic hypertension remains unclear, but  alpha-adrenergic activity may be the predominant pathophysiologic mechanism of orthostatic hypertension in elderly hypertensive patients. Other mechanisms are proposed for other groups with this disorder.

A prevalence of 1.1% was found in a large population study. The risk of orthostatic hypertension has been found to increase with age, with it being found in 16.3% of older hypertensive patients.

Causes 
The causes of this condition are not well understood, but research suggests that it may be caused by a combination of hemodynamic and neurohumoral factors.

Some studies have found that orthostatic hypertension may be caused by increased vascular resistance, possibly due to excess plasma shifts or increased blood viscosity. Other studies have suggested that it may be caused by a reduction in cardiac preload, or an increase in venous pooling.

Research suggests that it may be caused by an overshoot in neurohumoral adjustments to standing. Some studies have found that patients with orthostatic hypertension have normal levels of venous plasma norepinephrine, but that these levels increase excessively upon standing. However, other studies have not found elevated levels of norepinephrine in patients with orthostatic hypertension compared to hypertensive controls. These findings suggest that the causes of orthostatic hypertension may be multifactorial and more research is needed to fully understand the underlying mechanisms.

Signs and symptoms
 Mild or moderate orthostatic hypertension may present without any symptoms other than the orthostatic hypertension BP findings.  More severe orthostatic hypertension may present with the typical symptoms of hypertension.
 Orthostatic venous pooling is common with orthostatic diastolic hypertension. This occurs in the legs while standing.

Connections to other disorders
 Essential hypertension
 Other kinds of dysautonomia may coexist, e.g., postural orthostatic tachycardia syndrome (POTS) is common with this condition, orthostatic hypotension with the BP going both high and low at times due to autonomic dysfunction
 Type 2 diabetes
 Vascular adrenergic hypersensitivity: Orthostatic hypertension can be secondary to this
 Anorexia Nervosa: Many people suffering From anorexia experience orthostatic hypertension
 Hypovolemia can cause orthostatic hypertension
 Renal arterial stenosis (narrowing of the kidney arteries) with nephroptosis (kidney drops on standing) have been known to cause orthostatic hypertension.
 Aortitis (inflammation of the aorta) with nephroptosis: "This orthostatic hypertension largely may be due to an activation of the renin system caused by nephroptosis and partly due to a reduced baroreflex sensitivity caused by aortitis"
 Pheochromocytoma

Risks
 Blood pressure variability is associated with progression of target organ damage and cardiovascular risk.
 Orthostatic hypertension was positively associated with peripheral arterial disease.
 Increased occurrence of silent cerebrovascular ischemia
 Systolic orthostatic hypertension increases stroke risk.
 Orthostatic hypertension was associated with increased all-cause mortality.

Diagnosis

The condition can be assessed by a tilt table test.

Treatments
Currently, no treatments are officially recommended for orthostatic hypertension, as it is still little known and has various causes. Hence, treatment for those with this disorder is trial and error.
Some treatments which have been successfully used for this condition are medications doxazosin, carvedilol, captopril, and propranolol hydrochloride.  Treatment of coexisting conditions, e.g., hypovolemia, also is used. Some specialists in severe cases give saline intravenously for hypovolemia, which, if it is the cause, brings the orthostatic hypertension down to a safe level.  Pressure garments over the pelvis and the lower extremities may be used as part of treatment, due to the blood pooling issue occurring in many with the disorder.

Epidemiology 
The prevalence of this condition has been studied in various populations. In a study conducted in 1922, it was found that 4.2% of 2000 apparently healthy aviators aged 18 to 42 years had an increase in diastolic blood pressure from below 90 mmHg while supine to above 90 mmHg in the upright posture.

Study which defined orthostatic hypertension as a sustained increase in systolic blood pressure of at least 20 mmHg and/or diastolic blood pressure of at least 10 mmHg within 3 minutes of standing, have reported a prevalence rate of orthostatic hypertension ranging from 5% to 30%. This range is generally consistent with the prevalence of orthostatic hypotension.

See also 
 Orthostatic hypotension
 Orthostatic intolerance

References

Further reading 

 
 
 
 

Vascular diseases
Hypertension